So Damn Beautiful may refer to:
 So Damn Beautiful (Michael Murphy song)
 So Damn Beautiful (Poloroid song)